Murilo Henrique de Araujo Santos (born 2 December 1995), commonly known as Murilo, is a Brazilian professional footballer who plays as a left-back for Finnish club SJK.

Career
After a junior career in Portugal, a country which citinzeship Murilo also holds, Murilo moved back to Brazil to play in the  Brazilian Serie D, and joined the ranks of Rio Ave F.C.. After his short tenure in Brazil, he returned to Europe to join Spanish fifth division CD Cultural Areas in 2016. From there, he joined Ourense CF, where he played for four years. in 2020, Murilo was spotted by scouts and was offered a contract by Veikkausliiga side SJK Seinäjoki. During the  2020 Veikkausliiga season, he appeared in ten matches. During the following 2021 season, Murilo broke through, appearing in 25 of 27 Veikkausliiga matches. Murilo recorded eight assists and one goal in all competitions as SJK placed third. On 5 November 2021, Murilo signed a two-year contract with HJK. During the  2022 season , Murilo recorded 19 matches and 5 assists in the league. He also scored a vital free-kick goal in the first round of UEFA Champions League 2022-23 qualifying against FK Rīgas Futbola Skola, which tied the leg, which HJK went on to win on penalties, one of which Murilo scored. HJK ended up qualifying for the  Europa League, however, Murilo only played in the first match, against  Real Betis, coming on as a sub in the 76th minute. He returned to SJK ahead of the 2023 season.

Career statistics

References

2001 births
Living people
Brazilian footballers
Brazilian expatriate footballers
Portuguese footballers
Portuguese expatriate footballers
Association football defenders
Tercera División players
Veikkausliiga players
Rio Ave F.C. players
Varzim S.C. players
Rio Branco Atlético Clube players
Seinäjoen Jalkapallokerho players
Helsingin Jalkapalloklubi players
Brazilian expatriate sportspeople in Spain
Portuguese expatriate sportspeople in Spain
Expatriate footballers in Spain
Brazilian expatriate sportspeople in Finland
Portuguese expatriate sportspeople in Finland
Expatriate footballers in Finland